Symbolkeramik is a name given by archaeologists to a type of pottery found at settlements from the Spanish Chalcolithic and early Bronze Age such as the site of Los Millares.

The pottery is characterized by the use of highly-stylized designs, including the oculus motif. Another example of these stylized designs are found in Morbihan, France, on the Carnac megaliths.

References 

Bronze Age Europe
Copper Age Europe
Bronze Age art
Archaeology of Spain